David J. Swann (born June 13, 1942) is an American politician. He served as a Republican member for the 90th district of the Georgia House of Representatives.

Life and career 
Swann was born in Montgomery County, Pennsylvania. He attended John Carroll University, Lehigh University and Augusta Law School.

In 1977, Swann was elected to represent the 90th district of the Georgia House of Representatives. He served until 1983, when he was succeeded by Travis Stanley Barnes.

References 

1942 births
Living people
People from Montgomery County, Pennsylvania
Republican Party members of the Georgia House of Representatives
20th-century American politicians
John Carroll University alumni
Lehigh University alumni